Brandon Paddock is an American Pop and Rock musician and producer and member of Electronic Pop/Dance duo Fancy Cars.

Commercial success
Paddock has received two RIAA Platinum Records (awarded for the shipment of 1,000,000 units) for his work on Avril Lavigne's "Here's to Never Growing Up" and Christina Perri's "Human". He also earned an RIAA Gold Record (awarded for the shipment of 500,000 units) for Karmin's "Acapella".

Selected discography
Key: AP - Additional Production / P - producer / PRG - Programming / M - Mixer / E - Engineer / MA - Mastering / W - Writer / INST - other Instrumentation / VOX - Vocals / STRG - String Arrangement

References

Living people
American record producers
Year of birth missing (living people)
Place of birth missing (living people)